RAF West Kirby was a Royal Air Force basic training camp near West Kirby, Cheshire, later Merseyside, England.

Location
The camp entrance was on Saughall Massie Road, almost opposite Oldfield Lane.

History
It was set up at the beginning of the Second World War, as a basic training camp, to train new recruits into the Royal Air Force. Known as a "square bashing camp" in the vernacular, it was very first base (after kitting out at RAF Cardington) of most personnel there during the 1940s to 1960, although the final passing out parade took place on 20 December 1957. Most of the personnel were newly called up in the rank of AC2, the very lowest rank in the RAF, for their 2 years National Service in the British armed forces.

At this RAF Station, the men were given their initial training on their first entry into RAF which included first learning the RAF parade ground drill. with rifles, intensive physical fitness training, training in ground combat and defence under non-commissioned officers of the RAF Regiment and some education about the RAF and its history. Men, while undergoing their basic training at West Kirby, were accommodated in wooden barrack huts, each one housing about twenty men. Because West Kirby was a basic training camp, with no airfield there, discipline was very much stricter than in any normal RAF operational or trade training camp.

Recruits normally spent a period of eight weeks, (later on 6 weeks) on their training at West Kirby before being posted on to their "trade training" camp elsewhere in the United Kingdom. Approximately 150,000 conscripts went through its gates up until 1960, when the camp was demolished and the land converted back into farming fields. A dedication plaque was installed, where the camp entrance used to be, in 2004. Later, a commemorative stone was installed.

Gallery

References

 History of RAF West Kirby
 "The best years of their lives" 1945-1963 published by ITV for LWT

Further reading

External links

 RAF West Kirby Association

West Kirby
Metropolitan Borough of Wirral